Tectonic  is a British electronic music label, founded and run by Rob Ellis (Pinch) which focuses primarily on dubstep and its related genres. As one of the founding dubstep labels, alongside Tempa, DMZ, Hyperdub, and Hotflush, Tectonic became a focal point for the Bristol scene, as well as introducing artists and releases that were among the first to bridge a gap between dubstep and techno.

Alongside releases from artists such as Skream, Benga, Digital Mystikz & Joker, Tectonic has also been responsible for some of the scene's  albums - particularly, 2562's Unbalance and Pinch's Underwater Dancehall.

Catalogue

References

British record labels
Electronic music record labels
Record labels established in 2005
Dubstep record labels